Paravespa is an Afrotropical and Palearctic genus of potter wasps.

Species
The following species are classified under Paravespa:

 Paravespa africana Carpenter, Gusenleitner & Madl 2010
 Paravespa bonellii Giordani Soika, 1982
 Paravespa dewittei Giordani Soika, 1960
 Paravespa gestroi Magretti, 1884
 Paravespa grandis (Morawitz, 1885)
 Paravespa mima Giordani Soika, 1960
 Paravespa mimetica (Schulthess, 1923)
 Paravespa minutepunctata Giordani Soika, 1960
 Paravespa nairobiensis (Giordani Soika, 1935)
 Paravespa nigrifrons Giordani Soika, 1960
 Paravespa occidentalis Giordani Soika, 1987
 Paravespa pretoriensis (Giordani Soika, 1935)
 Paravespa quadricolor (Morawitz, 1885)
 Paravespa rex (Schulthess, 1923)
 Paravespa spinigera (Schulthess, 1914)
 Paravespa violaceipennnis Giordani Soika, 1960
 Paravespa zebroides (Meade-Waldo, 1915)

References

Hymenoptera genera
Potter wasps